Ratan Singh Rathore was the founder of Ratlam, governor of 16 parganas in northern Malwa and a renowned warrior of his time. He gained fame under the patronage of the Mughal emperor Shah Jahan.

Family
Ratan Singh was born 6 March 1619 as the eldest son of Mahesh Das of Jalore and his wife, Kusum Kumvar. His paternal grandfather, Dalpat Singh was the son of Raja Udai Singh of Marwar. ￼ His mother Kusum Kumvar was the daughter of Rajavat Kachawaha Lukaran of Amber. 

One of his paternal aunt was married to Rao Chattarsal of Bundi and the mother of Rao Bhao of Bundi.

Life 
At a young age of twenty-three, Ratan Singh, armed with nothing but a dagger fought and controlled a mad elephant in the streets of Delhi and impressed its Emperor. Ratan Singh was recruited as an imperial general by Shah Jahan and was posted in Afghanistan as a mansabdar. He continued to gain fame by defeating wild bands of central Asian invaders and by later campaigning against the Persians under the Mughal prince Dara Shukoh. In 1648 he was given a Mughal rank of 3000 horsemen, the standard of Mahi Maratib and the Jagir of Malwa, where he made Ratlam his capital. Ratan Singh was soon informed about Aurangzeb and Murad's betrayal and he immediately came to the aid of Shah Jahan to stop the Mughal princes. Ratan Singh fought the rebel army at Dharmatpur on 15 April 1658, most sources say that the Mughal generals deputed by Shah Jahan either fled or remained inactive throughout the battle. Ratan Singh thus took command of the remaining army and fought till his death.

Recognition
According to Karuna Joshi - "The Battle of Dharmat did not end after Jaswant Singh's flight from the war, but it was finished after the death of Ratan Singh." "Though Jaswant Singh fought bravely and got wounded, his escape from the battlefield was considered to be derogatory according to the custom of Rajasthan. So he obtained no place in the heroic poetry of Rajasthan. But Ratan singh's bravery, courage and sacrifice brought him name and fame which was amply described in the poems of contemporary poets like Khadia Jaga and Kumbhakaran Sada."

James Tod has written - "Of all the deeds of heroism performed on this day, those of Ratan of Ratlam by universal consent are pre-eminent and are wreathed into immortal rhyme by the bard in the Rasa Rao Ratna."

"Banhe Raso" , "Ratan Raso" and "Vachanika Rathore Ratan Maheshdasot Ri" are some works of Rajasthani literature that have written about Ratan Singhs life.

Successors
His successors founded the states of Ratlam, Sailana, Sitamau,

See also
Rathore
Ratlam State
Sailana State
Sitamau State

References

Rajput rulers
Indian military leaders
Hindu monarchs
Rathores
1658 deaths
Ratlam district